The New York and Long Branch Railroad  was a railroad in central New Jersey, running from Bay Head Junction in Bay Head to Perth Amboy, where it connected to the Central Railroad of New Jersey's Perth Amboy and Elizabethport Railroad. The railroad was jointly owned and operated by the Pennsylvania Railroad and the Central Railroad of New Jersey and became property of Conrail in 1976. It is now part of New Jersey Transit's North Jersey Coast Line.

Connections
The railroad had the following connections to others, from north to south:
Perth Amboy and Elizabethport Railroad (CNJ) at Perth Amboy (PRR had trackage rights north to the PRR's Perth Amboy and Woodbridge Railroad)
United New Jersey Railroad and Canal Company (PRR) at PRR Crossing South Amboy
Raritan River Railroad at South Amboy
Freehold and Atlantic Highlands Railroad (CNJ) at Matawan
New Jersey Southern Railroad (CNJ) at Red Bank
Monmouth Park Railroad at Oceanport
New Jersey Southern Railroad (CNJ) at Branchport
West End Railroad (CNJ) at West End
Freehold and Jamesburg Agricultural Railroad (PRR) at Sea Girt
Pennsylvania and Atlantic Railroad (PRR) at Bay Head Junction (CNJ trains turned around at a loop)

History
The company was incorporated on April 8, 1868; its line from Perth Amboy to Long Branch was built in 1875. On December 20, 1881 the following companies were merged into it, listed from north to south:
New Egypt and Farmingdale Railroad (inc. March 17, 1869, built 1876 from Long Branch to Belmar and the rest of the line to New Egypt never built)
Long Branch and Sea Girt Railroad (inc. June 18, 1875, built 1876 from Belmar to Sea Girt)
New York and Long Branch Extension Railroad (inc. March 10, 1880, built 1880 from Sea Girt to Point Pleasant)
Long Branch and Barnegat Bay Railroad (inc. September 23, 1880, built 1881 from Point Pleasant to Bay Head Junction)

At first, the railroad was leased by the CNJ; the PRR had plans for a parallel Perth Amboy and Long Branch Railroad. A January 3, 1882 agreement split the property between the CNJ and PRR, with trackage rights for each over the whole line. When Penn Central (the PRR's successor) and the CNJ merged into Conrail in 1976, the railroad was finally under control of one company. It is now part of New Jersey Transit's North Jersey Coast Line (NJCL)

Stations

See also
Raritan Bay Drawbridge

References

External links

Defunct New Jersey railroads
Companies affiliated with the Pennsylvania Railroad
Predecessors of the Central Railroad of New Jersey
Predecessors of Conrail
Transportation in Middlesex County, New Jersey
Transportation in Monmouth County, New Jersey
Transportation in Ocean County, New Jersey
Railroads transferred to Conrail
Railway companies established in 1868
Railway companies disestablished in 1976